Phimenes flavopictus is a species of potter wasp found in India, Sri Lanka, Nepal, China, Myanmar, Thailand, Malaysia, Singapore, and Indonesia.

References

Potter wasps
Insects described in 1845